Rhymer may refer to:

 Rhymer (actor), an actor in a seasonal folk play
 Rhymer (poet), a bad poet
 Rhymer (rapper), South Korean rapper and founder of Brand New Music
 Thomas the Rhymer, 13th century Scottish laird and reputed prophet

People with the surname
 Don Rhymer (1961–2012), American screenwriter
 Greg Rhymer (born 1972)
 Kitwana Rhymer (born 1978)
 Paul Rhymer (1905–1964), American radio writer